HealthEast Care System was a non-profit health care provider organization located in St. Paul, Minnesota and the surrounding suburban area. It included four hospitals, 14 clinics, medical transportation and a variety of other outpatient services. Founded in 1986, it was named one of the top ten health care systems in the United States by Thomson Reuters in 2009. In May 2017, it was approved for HealthEast Care System and the Minneapolis-based Fairview Health Services to merge. In October 2019, it officially became part of M Health Fairview.

Hospitals
Former HealthEast hospitals, now M Health Fairview include:
 Bethesda Hospital (a long-term acute care hospital)
 St. John's Hospital
 St. Joseph's Hospital
 Woodwinds Health Campus

Clinics
HealthEast Clinics provide primary and specialty care services and cover the east metro area of St. Paul, Minnesota. Its 14 locations include:
Cottage Grove
Downtown St. Paul
Grand Avenue, St. Paul
Hugo
Maplewood
Midway, St. Paul
Oakdale
Rice Street, St. Paul
Roselawn, St. Paul
Roseville
Stillwater
Tamarack, Woodbury
Vadnais Heights
Woodwinds, Woodbury

References

External links 
 M Health Fairview website
 Fairview website

Hospital networks in the United States
Non-profit organizations based in Minnesota
Health care companies based in Minnesota